The Zisa is alternatively listed as either a castle or palace, and located in the western area of Palermo, region of Sicily, Italy. The edifice was begun around 1165 by an Moorish craftsman under the rule of the Norman conqueror of Sicily, king William I of Sicily. It was not finished until 1189, under the rule of William II. It is presently open to the public for tours.

The name Zisa derives from the Arab term al-Azīz, meaning "dear" or "splendid". The same word, in Naskh script, is impressed in the entrance, according to the usual habit for the main Islamic edifices of the time. The structure was conceived as a summer residence for the Norman kings, as a part of the large hunting resort known as Genoardo (Arabic: Jannat al-arḍ, literally "Earthly Paradise") that included also the Cuba Sottana, the Cuba Soprana and the Uscibene palace, and extensive gardens, of which no traces remain. Joan of England, Queen of Sicily, widow of William II, was confined to the palace by the new king Tancred of Sicily due to her backing Princess Constance aunt of William II to ascend the throne.

At the end of the 15th century the building fell into disrepair while in private hands. In 1635, a new owner, Giovanni de Sandoval, cousin to the Viceroy of Sicily, acquired the palace for free due to its poor state. The palace remained in the hands of the Sandoval family until 1808, when it was eventually fell again to ruin once again. From 1808 to the 1950s the building was used a residence by the princes Notarbartolo di Sciara. In the 1990s, the building was picked up for restoration by the Region of Scallia. In July 2015 it was included in the UNESCO Arab-Norman Palermo and the Cathedral Churches of Cefalù and Monreale World Heritage Site.

Architectural Style 
The structure includes Islamic elements such as rounded archways, muqarnas, and vaulted niches. In the 14th century merlons were added, by partly destroying the Arab inscription (in Kufic characters) which embellished the upper part of the building. More substantial modifications were introduced in the 17th century, when the Zisa, reduced to very poor conditions, was purchased by Giovanni di Sandoval e Platamone, Marquis of S. Giovanni la Mendola, Prince of Castelreale, Lord of the Mezzagrana and the Zisa. The latter's marble coat of arms with two lions can be seen over the entrance fornix. Several rooms of the interior were modified and others added on the ceiling, a great stair was built, as well as new external windows.

Use 
As the Zisa was originally built as a semi-rural summer home, many of the styling choices reflect this. A pool at the front of the building flowed through open channels into the interior to the main hall. The architect chose to use thicker material for building and smaller windows to keep a stable internal temperature. The castle had a fully functional air conditioning system that allowed airflow throughout the whole of the building that was heavily inspired by Egyptian and Mesopotamian architectural styles and the architect also made the conscious choice to build the building facing towards the ocean.

Gallery

See also
 History of medieval Arabic and Western European domes

References

Bibliography 
 Giuseppe Bellafiore: La Zisa di Palermo, Flaccovio, Palermo, 1994.
 Donald Matthew: The Norman Kingdom of Sicily, Cambridge University Press, 1992.
 John Julius Norwich: The Normans in Sicily: The Normans in the South 1016-1130 and the Kingdom in the Sun 1130-1194, Penguin, 1992.
 Seindal, René. 2003. "Zisa: Early Medieval Hunting Castle in the Arab Norman Style". http://sights.seindal.dk/ sight/76_Zisa.html.
 “La Zisa - Palermo, Italy.” Atlas Obscura, Atlas Obscura, 29 Nov. 2013, https://www.atlasobscura.com/places/la-zisa.
 "La Zisa". 1997. Storia dei Monumenti Siciliani Website. http://www.grifasi-sicilia.com/monumpalermo1.htm
 "Palazzo della Ziza". Le Normands: Peuple d'Europe Website. http://www.mondes-normands.caen.fr/angleterre/  Patrimoine_architectural/Italie/sicile/palazzi/1154_1189/38/index.htm.

Buildings and structures completed in the 12th century
Castles in Palermo
Palaces in Palermo
Arab-Norman architecture in Palermo
Royal residences in the Kingdom of Sicily
Romanesque palaces
Norman architecture in Italy
Islamic architecture
Castles in Sicily
Museums in Palermo
Historic house museums in Italy
World Heritage Sites in Italy
Arab-Norman Palermo and the Cathedral Churches of Cefalù and Monreale